Julie Cope Hilden (April 19, 1968 - March 17, 2018) was an American novelist and lawyer.

Biography
Hilden grew up in Hawaii and New Jersey. She graduated with a B.A. in philosophy from Harvard College, a J.D. from Yale Law School, and an M.F.A. from Cornell University.
Upon graduating from law school, she clerked for then-Chief Judge Stephen G. Breyer of the U.S. Court of Appeals for the First Circuit, and for Judge Kimba M. Wood of the U.S. District Court for the Southern District of New York.  She was admitted to the New York and District of Columbia bars.  She was a litigation associate at the law firm of Williams & Connolly in Washington, D.C., from 1996 to 1999. She worked on First Amendment, criminal defense, appellate cases, and other issues.  As a legal writer her commentaries can be found on her webpage at Justia's Verdict. She was a legal commentator on Good Morning America, Court TV, CNN, and NPR, and local television and radio stations. She lived for several years with  her husband, Stephen Glass. Hilden passed away at the age of 49 due to complications from early-onset Alzheimer's disease, the same illness with which her mother had dealt.

Bibliography
The Bad Daughter, a memoir, is Julie Hilden’s first book. Her second book and first novel, 3, was published by Plume in August 2003. Actes Sud Publishing translated it for the French market, Bantam Books released it in the UK, and it received a Czech translation. 3 was optioned for a film adaptation; Hilden was reportedly writing the first draft of the screenplay.

References

External links
 Legal articles at Findlaw.com
 Her web page (web.archive.org)

21st-century American novelists
American legal writers
American women novelists
American romantic fiction writers
Cornell University alumni
Harvard College alumni
Yale Law School alumni
American women lawyers
Women romantic fiction writers
21st-century American women writers
American women non-fiction writers
21st-century American non-fiction writers
1968 births
2018 deaths
Deaths from Alzheimer's disease